"Whatever You Want" is the title of a number-one R&B single written by Tony! Toni! Tone! member Dwayne Wiggins and also performed by the group. It was the fourth and final single released from their second album, The Revival. The song spent two weeks at number one on the US R&B chart and peaked at number forty-eight on the Billboard Hot 100. It is their first single that did not feature Raphael on lead vocals.

The song was sampled in a number of songs including Kelly Price's "Soul of a Woman", in the remix of Ludacris's "Splash Waterfalls", in "Luven' Me" by rapper Nelly, in "OTW" by DJ Luke Nasty, and in "Whatever You Need" by Meek Mill.

References

See also
List of number-one R&B singles of 1991 (U.S.)

1991 singles
Tony! Toni! Toné! songs
1990 songs
Mercury Records singles
Songs written by D'wayne Wiggins
Wing Records singles
Contemporary R&B ballads
1990s ballads